Jean-Pierre de Keyser (born 13 April 1965) is a retired German football player.

Honours
 UEFA Cup winner: 1987–88

References

External links
 

1965 births
Living people
German footballers
Bundesliga players
2. Bundesliga players
Bayer 04 Leverkusen players
Bayer 04 Leverkusen II players
VfL Osnabrück players
UEFA Cup winning players
Association football defenders
West German footballers